Gordon Wilson may refer to:

Politicians
Gordon Wilson (British Columbia politician) (born 1949), Canadian politician, former leader of British Columbia Liberal Party
Gordon Wilson (Nova Scotia politician) (born 1955), Canadian politician, member of the Nova Scotia House of Assembly
Gordon Wilson (peace campaigner) (1927–1995), Irish peace campaigner and senator
Gordon Wilson (Scottish politician) (1938–2017), leader of the Scottish National Party
Gordon Crooks Wilson (1872–1937), Conservative and Unionist Party member of the Canadian House of Commons

Sportspeople

Phat Wilson (Gordon Allan Wilson, 1895–1970), Canadian ice-hockey player
Gordon Wilson (American football) (1915–1997), American football player
Gordon Wilson (footballer, born 1944), Scottish footballer
Gordon Wilson (footballer, born 1904) (1904–1947), English footballer

Other people
Gordon Wilson (architect) (1900–1959), New Zealand architect
Sir Gordon Wilson (British Army officer) (1887–1971), British Army officer
Gordon Chesney Wilson (1865–1914), British Army officer